The unicameral National Assembly (Creole: Lasanble Nasyonal) is the Seychelles's legislative body. 

The National Assembly in its current constellation formed following elections held on 22–24 October 2020, with a total of 35 members.The current Speaker of the National Assembly is Roger Mancienne, in office since 28 October 2020.

Background 
The current National Assembly was preceded by the Legislative Council of Seychelles from 1962 to 1970, the Legislative Assembly from 1970 to 1974, the House of Assembly from 1975 to 1976, the National Assembly 1976 to 1977 and the People's Assembly from 1979 to 1993.

26 members are elected in single member constituencies using the simple majority (or First-past-the-post) system. The remaining up to nine members are elected through a system of proportional representation.  Members serve five-year terms. 

The working language of the National Assembly is Seychellois Creole.  With permission from the speaker, members may address the assembly in English or French.  Visitors may address the assembly in other languages with the speaker's permission.

List of speakers 

Speakers and deputy speakers of the National Assembly of Seychelles since the 1993 multiparty elections:

Parliamentary leaders 
The members serving as Leader of Government Business since 1993:

The members serving as Leader of the Opposition since 1993:

2020 National Assembly elections

See also 
History of Seychelles
Legislative branch
List of national legislatures

References

External links 
 

1993 establishments in Seychelles
Government of Seychelles
Seychelles
Seychelles